Patanjali was a Hindu author, mystic and philosopher.

Patanjali or Pathanjali may also refer to:
 Patanjali Ayurved - An Indian FMCG company producing Ayurvedic products
 Patanjali Yogpeeth - A Yoga institute in Haridwar, Uttarakhand, India 
 K. N. Y. Patanjali - A journalist, writer from Andhra Pradesh
 Patanjali Foods Ltd - Formerly known as Ruchi Soya Industries